Clubs affiliated with Capital Football in the Australian Capital Territory (ACT) - and surrounding areas of New South Wales - competed in 2014 for the Capital Football Federation Cup. Teams from the same Club playing in multiple divisions were allowed to compete. This knockout competition was won by Belconnen United, their 4th title.

It was originally intended by Capital Football that the 2014 Federation Cup would be the qualifying tournament to determine the ACT qualifier for the inaugural 2014 FFA Cup, however the competition was not decided until after the qualifier needed to be named. The previous winner instead qualified to the Round of 32 for 2014. As compensation, winning this competition also entitled Belconnen United to enter the 2015 FFA Cup preliminary rounds in the Fifth round, one round later than the other ACT NPL teams.

Schedule

†–After extra time

First round
17 teams from various divisions of the ACT State Leagues, including 1 Masters teams, entered into the competition at this stage. Matches in this round were played between 10 April and 6 May.

 Byes:– Canberra City (SL1).

Second round
7 Clubs from the ACT National Premier League (Tier 2) entered into the competition at this stage. Matches in this round were played between 13 May and 4 June.

Quarter-finals
Matches in this round were played on 12 June and 17 June.

Semi-finals
Matches in this round were played on 24 June and 26 June.

Final

References

2014 in Australian soccer